COMDEX (an abbreviation of COMputer Dealers' EXhibition) was a computer expo trade show held in the  Las Vegas Valley of Nevada, United States, each November from 1979 to 2003.  It was one of the largest computer trade shows in the world, usually second only to the German CeBIT, and one of the largest trade shows in any industry sector. COMDEX exhibitions were held in many other countries from 1982 to 2005, with 185 shows altogether. The first COMDEX was held in 1979 at the MGM Grand (now Horseshoe), with 167 exhibitors and 3904 attendees. In 1981, the first COMDEX/Spring was held in New York City.

History

Organizers

The Interface Group
COMDEX was started by The Interface Group, whose organizers included Sheldon Adelson, and Richard Katzeff. In 1995, they sold the show to the Japanese technology conglomerate Softbank Corp. In 2001, Softbank sold the show to Key3Media, a spin-off of Ziff Davis. After entering Chapter 11 bankruptcy in February 2003, Key3Media resurfaced as Medialive International with a cash infusion from Thomas Weisel Capital Partners, which had previously invested in the company. In November 2006, Forbes magazine reported that United Business Media PLC had purchased the events assets of MediaLive International Inc.

Northeast Computer Faire
Personal Computer Faire in San Francisco, the Northeast Computer Faire in Boston, and Southern California Computer Faire were presented by Computer Faire Inc., Newton, Mass., a subsidiary of Prentice-Hall.

Northeast Computer Faire 1988 was presented by The Interface Group and Boston Computer Society in Boston.

Attendance
COMDEX was initially restricted to those directly involved in the computer industry. It was the one show where all levels of manufacturers and developers of computers, peripherals, software, components, and accessories met with distributors, retailers, consultants and their competitors.

Colloquially known as "Geek Week", COMDEX evolved into a major technical convention, with the industry making major product announcements and releases there.  Numerous small companies from around the world rose to prominence following appearance at COMDEX, and industry leaders sought opportunities to make keynote addresses.  They discussed the computer industry, history, trends and future potential. The first COMDEX Conference, attracted 4000 paying attendees and grew to over 100,000, becoming a launch platform for key technologies. Bluetooth and USB had conference programming and associated exhibition floor pavilions to help these technologies and start up companies be seen in such a large event and marketplace. In 1982, Microsoft founder Bill Gates attended the conference and saw a demonstration of VisiCorp's Visi On, a GUI software suite for IBM PC compatible computers. The development of Windows 1.0 began soon thereafter. In 1999, Linus Torvalds attended the exhibition to talk about the Linux family of operating system. A Linux conference and exhibition hall was a co-located event, helping elevate the open source products.

In the late 1980s, COMDEX was opened to the general public, causing an explosion in attendance,  but diluting COMDEX's  wholesale industry focus.  Retailers and consultants complained that 'leading edge' customers, upon whom they relied for early adoption of new technology, were buying products at 'show specials' and then expecting the dealers to support those products. . The broadening of audience criteria came about as IT departments decentralized and purchasing of technology products shifted from a central corporate IT budget to departments and company divisions, mirroring the shift from mainframes to decentralized networks and local area networking, and later the Internet as the corporate backbone.

Cities other than Las Vegas
After the Spring 1981 show in New York City and 1982 in Atlantic City, COMDEX began regular spring shows in Atlanta, Georgia from 1983 through 1988. Then alternated sites between Atlanta and Chicago.  The final Atlanta Spring COMDEX was held in 1997; the last Spring COMDEX was planned for Chicago in April 2003 but cancelled.

The first COMDEX show outside the US was held in Amsterdam 1982. In the record years 1998 and 2000, 21 exhibitions were arranged yearly all over the world: Europe, Asia, Africa, Australia and other parts of America. 69% of the 185 shows took place outside the US. Even when the US shows were cancelled, they kept on for a short time, e.g. Gothenburg and São Paulo 2004 and the last in Athens in November 2005. The decline occurred globally: the 2000 show in Basel with 1400 exhibitors drew 79000 attendees, but 2001 17% less.

Early 2000s and closing
Following COMDEX Fall 1999 (in Las Vegas), organizers made major changes to their criteria for admission of mass media, adjusting criteria to accommodate bloggers with significant market reach, but also restricting simple and open access to anyone declaring themselves 'media'. It offered regular public attendance for the general public.

In 2000, major companies such as IBM, Apple, and Compaq (now merged with Hewlett-Packard) decided to discontinue their involvement with COMDEX to allocate resources more efficiently, usually through their own corporate events or other direct-to-consumer selling (Apple Stores), and the bursting of the dot-com bubble caused a decline on the IT market. To reduce costs following the market downturns after the 9/11 attacks many would-be exhibitors stopped renting out or scaled back official COMDEX booths on the convention center floors, and set up invitation-only suites in various Las Vegas hotels. This also allowed exhibitors to concentrate their efforts on industry attendees rather than the general public.

COMDEX/Fall 2001 organizers at Los Angeles-based Key3Media Group Inc. said they expected attendance to fall from the previous year's 200,000 to 150,000. They also expected the number of exhibitors to decline from 2,350 to 2,000 and the square footage of exhibitor space to slide from just over 1 million to 750,000.

The last Las Vegas show in November 2003 attracted only 500 exhibitors and 40,000 visitors.

In June 2004, COMDEX cancelled the 2004 exhibition in Las Vegas, effectively making the Consumer Electronics Show its replacement in Las Vegas. By 2004 the personal computer had become a commodity item priced at levels individual departments and consumers overall could buy without needing much corporate oversight, so "computers" became just one of many products in the consumer electronics channels and the Consumer Electronics Show.

COMDEXvirtual
A COMDEX event originally designed to exist only on the internet without a physical meeting location. It was announced to commence during November 16–17, 2010. The COMDEX website (www.comdex.com) was operated by TechWeb, a United Business Media company.

Everything Channel and sister company UBM studios (both United Business Media Companies) partnered to deliver COMDEXvirtual (www.comdexvirtual.com) to the global IT channel community in November 2010. Nearly 5,000 attended the event over the course of the two days, making COMDEXvirtual the largest independent virtual tradeshow in the IT industry.  The agenda featured more than 100 speakers and nearly 50 sessions on topics ranging from cloud to mobility and virtualization, to address the event's theme—New Business Solutions: Embracing Disruptive Technologies & Changing Delivery Models. In addition to educational sessions, there was also an Expo Hall with nearly 30 exhibitors including IBM, Intel, Microsoft, Symantec, Panasonic, and D&H. COMDEXvirtual (www.comdexvirtual.com) 2010 was available on-demand through May 17, 2011.  The event returned on November 15 and 16, 2011, with 4,300 attendees, and ultimately in 2012.

List of all COMDEX events

See also
 CES (Consumer Electronics Show) (Las Vegas, Nevada, US)
 CeBIT (Centrum der Büro und Informations Technik) (Hanover, Germany)
 Computex Taipei (Taipei, Taiwan)
 E3 (Los Angeles, California)

References 

Computer-related trade shows
Las Vegas Valley conventions and trade shows
Recurring events established in 1979
Recurring events disestablished in 2005
Informa brands
Sheldon Adelson